Ethyl methyl cellulose is a thickener, vegetable gum, foaming agent and emulsifier.  Its E number is E465.
 
Chemically, it is a derivative of cellulose with ethyl and methyl groups attached by ether linkages.  It can be prepared by treatment of cellulose with dimethyl sulfate and ethyl chloride in the presence of an alkali.

See also
 Ethyl cellulose
 Methyl cellulose

References

Cellulose
Food additives
Cellulose ethers